Triple Crown may refer to:

Sports

Horse racing
 Triple Crown of Thoroughbred Racing 
 Triple Crown of Thoroughbred Racing (United States)
 Triple Crown Trophy
 Triple Crown Productions
 Canadian Triple Crown of Thoroughbred Racing
 Triple Crown of Harness Racing for Pacers
 Triple Crown of Harness Racing for Trotters
 Triple Crown of Hurdling

Motor racing
 Triple Crown of Motorsport
 Triple Crown of Endurance racing
 Triple Crown (IndyCar)

Professional wrestling
 Triple Crown Heavyweight Championship, Japan
 Triple Crown (professional wrestling), mainly United States

Other endeavors
 Triple Crown of Alpine Skiing
 Triple Crown (baseball)
 Triple Crown (basketball)
 Triple Crown of Boxing
 Triple Crown of Brazilian Football
 Triple crown of bridge
 Triple Crown of Cycling
 Triple Crown (golf)
 Triple Crown of Hiking
 Triple Crown (poker)
 Triple Crown (rugby union)
 Triple Crown (snooker)
 Triple Crown (tennis)
 Triple Crown of Surfing
 Triple Crown of Open Water Swimming
 Triple Crown Tournament, cricket
 Triple Crown, of Nordic skiing
 Triple Crown Tour, of USA Ultimate
 Triple Crown of Canoe Racing

Other uses
 Chiappa Triple Crown, Italian made triple-barrel shotguns
 Coat of arms of the Drapers Company, 1439 emblem with three triple crowns
 Papal tiara, the three-tiered crown that was used by popes for centuries
 Triple accreditation, in business schools
 Triple Crown of Acting, for winners of an Academy Award, an Emmy Award, and a Tony Award in acting categories
 Triple Crown (UK entertainment), for winners of a British Academy Film Award, a British Academy Television Award, and a Laurence Olivier Award in acting categories
 Triple Crown Records, a record label
 Triple Crown of National High Adventure award, associated with High Adventure Bases of the Boy Scouts of America
 Triple Crown of Science Fiction, Nebula Award, Hugo Award, and Philip K. Dick Award won by William Gibson

See also
 Grand Tour (cycling)
 Grand Slam (golf)
 Grand Slam (tennis)
 Three Crowns, an emblem of Sweden
 Three crowns (disambiguation)
 Three Kingdoms (disambiguation)
 Treble (association football)
 Treble (handball), for example FC Barcelona Handbol
 Triple Gold Club in ice hockey
 Winston Million, in NASCAR